James Gandhi, is a British actor, producer and writer. He is best known for his role playing Ben in the BBC children's sitcom Dani's House between 2008 and 2012.  He first appeared in My Life as a Popat at the age of 10. He subsequently co-starred in the horror film Eden Lake and appeared in 2 episodes of House of Anubis.

As of 2021, he's an executive producer for Mammoth Screens, which developed Noughts + Crosses and Three Families for the BBC.

Filmography

References

External links
 

Living people
People from Cheltenham
British male actors of Indian descent
21st-century English male actors
English male child actors
English male television actors
Year of birth missing (living people)